Burnout 2: Point of Impact is a racing video game developed by Criterion Games and published by Acclaim Entertainment for PlayStation 2, GameCube and Xbox. It is the sequel to the 2001 video game Burnout and the second title in the Burnout series. It was the last Burnout game to be released on the GameCube and the series would not see a release on a Nintendo platform until the release of Burnout Legends in 2005. The game also marked Acclaim's last entry in the Burnout series, as Acclaim would go bankrupt in 2004; the rest of the series would be published by Electronic Arts.

Gameplay 
The goal of Burnout 2: Point of Impact is to race circuits around a track, either alone, against the game artificial intelligence or human opponents. The tracks feature traffic, complex junctions and obstacles which can make driving at high speeds difficult. To travel faster, the player needs to accumulate Boost. This can be done by driving down the wrong side of the road, drifting around corners at high speeds, swerving to avoid traffic and hitting jumps at speed to gain air. Colliding with traffic or scenery at high speed causes the car to lose control and crash. After a short interval a replacement car then appears on the track without damage, but with a loss of boost.

The game also includes a "Crash" mode, in which the player(s) earn points by causing damage to other vehicles. Crash mode is generally seen as the "puzzle" aspect of Burnout, as each scenario's vehicles are not randomised. This adds a layer of strategy, as well as trial and error, to determine which angle, speed, and point of impact is required to obtain maximum points. The points are given in cash (dollars).

There is also a Pursuit mode where the player takes the role of a cop and must wreck an escaping criminal's car to arrest him, thereby unlocking the car.

The game contains a few glitches such as "the teleport glitch", where the car being driven flies off the edge of a mountain or bridge, and ends up in a higher position than where they were before, and the "flying truck glitch", which happens in crash mode when a large truck has its front turned sideways at a ninety-degree angle and becomes airborne.

The Xbox version of the game is subtitled the "Developer's Cut" and it features 21 new car skins, 15 more "crash" mode tracks, which totals up to 30 "crash" mode tracks in all and an Xbox Live online leaderboard, which was also the first use of Xbox Live in a Burnout game. The GameCube version of the game also includes the 15 additional crash mode tracks.

The GameCube and PlayStation 2 versions include all the custom cars from the Xbox version, but they do not have customisable liveries, online functions, or custom soundtrack capabilities.

Promotion 
To promote the game, Acclaim offered to reimburse any driver in the United Kingdom who received a speeding ticket. Following a negative reaction to this from the UK government, the plan was cancelled.

Reception 

Burnout 2: Point of Impact received "favourable" reviews on all platforms according to video game review aggregator Metacritic.

GameSpot noted of the PS2 version: "The inclusion of the well-done championship and multiplayer modes make it a must-own for fans of arcade racing". The publication also named it the best Xbox game of April 2003. GameSpy stated of the PS2 version, that "if Gran Turismo 3 is Dom Perignon, Burnout 2 is Jack Daniels. While Dom may be a great guy, personally I'd rather hang out with Jack". IGN called the same version "an excellent sequel in every way. It's better looking, longer, faster, deeper, and it's got little flourishes and extra modes of play that truly impress". Eurogamer's Kristan Reed said the game was worth playing whether or not you liked the first game in the series. Reed thought the multiplayer mode was a little disappointing, with a lower frame rate than other parts of the game but was otherwise highly complimentary, stating:

Edge magazine ranked the game 75th on their 100 Best Video Games in 2007.

References

External links 

2002 video games
Acclaim Entertainment games
Burnout (series)
GameCube games
PlayStation 2 games
Video games about police officers
Video games developed in the United Kingdom
Video games set in the United States
Xbox games
Criterion Games games
Multiplayer and single-player video games
RenderWare games